Snader Telescriptions, produced for television from 1950 to 1952, were film versions of popular and classical music performances. Singers, dancers, orchestras, and novelty acts appeared in the Snader musicals. They were produced by Louis D. Snader, a Southern California theater owner who branched out into television and then real estate. Lionel Hampton was announced as the first "music world personality to face video film cameras" in the July 22, 1950 issue of Billboard.

In 1951, exotica musician and organist Korla Pandit left his KTLA show Adventures in Music to work with Snader, resulting in short films which gave Pandit a national TV audience. However, in 1953, problems with contract negotiations prompted Snader to replace Pandit with Liberace, which launched the pianist to fame. Pandit then hosted a show on KGO-TV in San Francisco.

The name "telescriptions" is a portmanteau of "television" and "transcriptions" (recordings intended for broadcast). Snader's three-minute films are similar to Soundies and Scopitones, miniature musicals filmed in the 1940s and 60s. Many telescriptions were later re-edited into television programs and feature films.

References
(Includes a short history of Snader Telescriptions, and lists telescriptions made by Soundies performers)
New York Times review: Dixieland Jazz, Vol. 1: The Snader Telescriptions - The Bobcats & Jack Teagarden
TV's first music videos
Rotten Tomatoes: TV's First Music Videos - The Snader Telescriptions
MacDonald & Associates: Snader Telescriptions

Music videos